Stanisław Żmijan (born 13 December  1956 in Tarnogród) is a Polish politician. He was elected to the Sejm on 25 September 2005, getting 7708 votes in 7 Chełm district as a candidate from the Civic Platform list.

He was also a member of Sejm 2001-2005.

See also
Members of Polish Sejm 2005-2007

External links
Stanisław Żmijan - parliamentary page - includes declarations of interest, voting record, and transcripts of speeches.

Members of the Polish Sejm 2005–2007
Members of the Polish Sejm 2001–2005
Civic Platform politicians
1956 births
Living people
Members of the Polish Sejm 2007–2011
Members of the Polish Sejm 2011–2015